Tainted Horseplay (literally: A Hoof Here, a Hoof There) is a Czechoslovak drama film directed by Věra Chytilová and released in 1989. The film was entered into the 16th Moscow International Film Festival. The film was selected as the Czechoslovak entry for the Best Foreign Language Film at the 62nd Academy Awards, but was not accepted as a nominee.

Cast and characters
 Tomáš Hanák as Pepe
 Milan Steindler as Grandpa
 David Vávra as Frantisek
 Tereza Kučerová as Jirina
 Bára Dlouhá as Jana
 Chantal Poullain as Foreign woman (as Chantal Poullain-Polívková)
 Jiří Bartoška
 Josef Kobr

See also
 List of submissions to the 62nd Academy Awards for Best Foreign Language Film
 List of Czechoslovak submissions for the Academy Award for Best Foreign Language Film

References

External links
 

1989 films
1989 drama films
1980s Czech-language films
Films directed by Věra Chytilová
Czechoslovak drama films
1980s Czech films
HIV/AIDS in film
Czech drama films